The Stepmom is a Mexican television series produced by Carmen Armendáriz for TelevisaUnivision. It aired on Las Estrellas from 15 August 2022 to 21 October 2022. The series is a reboot based on the 2005 Mexican telenovela of the same name, and the fifth production of the Fábrica de sueños franchise. The series stars Aracely Arámbula and Andrés Palacios.

Plot 
During a trip to Spain, Marcia Cisneros is accused of murdering Nicolás Escalante and is sentenced to 35 years in prison. Esteban Lombardo, her husband, considers her not only a murderer but an adulteress who killed her lover to cover up her betrayal, so he abandons her and files for divorce. Marcia is certain that she is innocent and that among her ex-husband's friends is the murderer, so she studies law while in prison to reopen her case. 

Twenty years later, a lawyer manages to get her early release and she returns to Mexico to clear her name and be reunited with her children, but they believe her dead. Lucrecia, Esteban's older sister, placed a portrait of an unknown woman in their home and the children grew up adoring the woman in the portrait. Marcia summons all the suspects, who are shocked to see her, but to win over her children and investigate each of the suspects, she changes her name and introduces herself as Marisa Jones. Marcia forces Esteban to break up with his fiancée in order to marry her, thus becoming the stepmother to her own children.

Cast 
 Aracely Arámbula as Marcia Cisneros / Marisa Jones
 Andrés Palacios as Esteban Lombardo
 Marisol del Olmo as Lucrecia Lombardo
 Juan Carlos Barreto as Father José Jaramillo
 Martha Julia as Florencia Linares
 Marco Treviño as Donato Rivas
 Cecilia Gabriela as Emilia Zetina
 Juan Martín Jauregui as Bruno Tejeda
 Isadora González as Inés Lombardo
 Denia Agalianou as Paula Ferrer
 Eduardo España as Rufino González "El Tortuga"
 Montserrat Marañón as Cándida Nuñez
 Ricardo Fastlicht as Francisco "Pancho" Nuñez
 Epy Velez as Violeta Pardo
 Carmen Muga as Alba Bermejo
 Adrián Di Monte as Álvaro González
 Iker Madrid as La Condesa
 Alberto Pavón as Iñaki Arnella
 David Caro Levy as Hugo Lombardo Cisneros
 Ana Tena as Lucía Lombardo Cisneros
 Emiliano González as Rafael Lombardo Cisneros
 Julia Urbini as Celia Nuñez
 Sebastían Fouilloux as Omar Escalante
 Christopher Valencia as Pablo Nuñez
 José Elías Moreno as Santino González

Guest star 
 Gabriel Soto as Nicolás Escalante

Recurring 
 Vilma Sotomayor as Rebeca Escalante
 Palmeira Cruz as Betina
 Diego Soldano as Gaspar Iglesias

Production 
In October 2018, the series was announced to be part of the Fábrica de sueños franchise. In May 2022, the series was presented during the Univision upfront for the 2022–2023 television season, with Aracely Arámbula and Andrés Palacios being announced in the lead roles. Filming began on 6 June 2022.

Ratings 
 
}}

Episodes

Notes

References

External links 
 

2022 telenovelas
2022 Mexican television series debuts
2022 Mexican television series endings
2020s Mexican television series
Televisa telenovelas
Mexican telenovelas
Spanish-language telenovelas